Bongkoch Publishing is a Thai publisher based in Thailand. It produced mainly shōjo, romance and fantasy comics. Alongside Vibulkij, Nation, and Siam Inter Comics, it was one of four companies to publish comics in Thailand in the 1990s. The price of the books is about 45 to 200 baht (2009).

Gallery

References

External links
 Bongkoch Comics 

Comic book publishing companies of Thailand
Mass media companies of Thailand